Parkland, Philadelphia is a section of Philadelphia, Pennsylvania, United States which follows the Schuylkill River. It contains many of Philadelphia's major parks and encompasses a portion of Northwest Philadelphia. Fairmount Park and Wissahickon Valley Park are located in this section.

Demographics
Parkland has a very low permanent population. As of March 2018, there are 1,278 residents.

References 

Neighborhoods in Philadelphia
North Philadelphia